May Vale (1862–1945), was an Australian painter. She was reportedly the first women to be elected a member of the Buonarotti Society.

Biography
Vale was born in Ballarat on 18 November 1862. Her family moved to Melbourne 1872. Her family then moved to London, England in 1874.

Vale attended the Royal College of Art in London, Then in 1879, after returning to Melbourne she attended the National Gallery Art Schools, studying under Oswald Rose Campbell, George Folingsby and Frederick McCubbin. Her colleagues at the school included Jane Sutherland and Clara Southern.

In 1893 she also opened a studio at 119 Swanston Street where she gave art lessons and worked as a commissioned portrait painter. In 1895 she set up an art school at Flinders Buildings, where she taught plein air painting. One of her students was Alice Marian Ellen Bale.

She was said to be the first woman to join the Buonarotti society, but there are other claimants including Winnie Brotherton in 1883.

In 1906 Vale returned to London where she studied enamelling at the Chelsea Polytechnic Institute.

Vale exhibited her painting and her enamels throughout her life at venues including the Victorian Artists Society, the Women's Art Club, and the Athenaeum.

She had a one-woman show in 1927 at Queens Hall.

She was a member of the Buonarotti Club, the Victorian Artists Society, and the Yarra Sculptors' Society.

Vale died on 6 August 1945 in Melbourne.

Legacy
Vale's works are in the collections of the National Gallery of Victoria, the Art Gallery of New South Wales.

Gallery

References

External links

 images of May Vale's paintings on Australian Art Auction Records 
 Women of the Heidelberg School, by Andrew MacKenzie, sponsored by the Victorian Government

1862 births
1945 deaths
19th-century Australian women artists
20th-century Australian women artists
20th-century Australian artists
Alumni of Chelsea College of Arts
Alumni of the Royal College of Art
Artists from Victoria (Australia)
People from Ballarat